Doto affinis is a species of sea slug, a nudibranch, a marine gastropod mollusc in the family Dotidae.

Distribution
This species was described from La Rochelle, France.

DescriptionDoto affinis is described and illustrated as an animal with rhinophores in sheaths like other Doto species but with smooth cerata capped with white, resembling an aeolid. It is said to be similar to Doto coronata and found in similar places.

EcologyDoto affinis'' is a species which has not been recognised by recent authors.

References

Dotidae
Gastropods described in 1837